Kapatid Channel (stylized as Kapatid) is an international Philippine subscription television channel owned by Pilipinas Global Network, Ltd. The channel offers programming highlights from the Philippine television channels TV5, One Sports, Sari-Sari Channel, Colours, One News, One Sports+, One PH, BuKo, PBA Rush and UAAP Varsity Channel.

Programming

Current programs

TV5
Newscast
 Frontline Pilipinas (delayed telecast)
 Frontline Pilipinas Weekend (upcoming, delayed telecast)

See also
TV5 Network
TV5
AksyonTV International
 The Filipino Channel
 GMA Pinoy TV

References

External links
KapatidTV site

International broadcasters
Television networks in the United States
TV5 Network channels
Filipino diaspora
Filipino-language television stations
Television channels and stations established in 2011
2011 establishments in the Philippines